90 (ninety) is the natural number preceded by 89 and followed by 91.

In the English language, the numbers 90 and 19 are often confused, as they sound very similar. When carefully enunciated, they differ in which syllable is stressed: 19 /naɪnˈtiːn/ vs 90 /ˈnaɪnti/. However, in dates such as 1999, and when contrasting numbers in the teens and when counting, such as 17, 18, 19, the stress shifts to the first syllable: 19 /ˈnaɪntiːn/.

In mathematics 
90 is a pronic number, as it is the product of 9 and 10. It is nontotient and divisible by the sum of its decimal digits, making it a Harshad number.
It is the third unitary perfect number, since it is the sum of its unitary divisors excluding itself, and because it is equal to the sum of a subset of its divisors, it is also a semiperfect number. 

90 is the fifth sum of non-triangular numbers, respectively between the fifth and sixth triangular numbers, 15 and 21 (equivalently 16 + 17 ... + 20).

In normal space, the interior angles of a rectangle measure 90 degrees each. Also, in a right triangle, the angle opposing the hypotenuse measures 90 degrees, with the other two angles adding up to 90 for a total of  degrees. Thus, an angle measuring 90 degrees is called a right angle.

The truncated dodecahedron and truncated icosahedron both have 90 edges. A further four uniform star polyhedra (U37, U55, U58, U66) and four uniform compound polyhedra (UC32, UC34, UC36, UC55) contain 90 edges or vertices.

The rhombic enneacontahedron is a zonohedron with a total of 90 rhombic faces: 60 broad rhombi akin to those in the rhombic dodecahedron with diagonals in  ratio, and another 30 slim rhombi with diagonals in  golden ratio. The obtuse angle of the broad rhombic faces is also the dihedral angle of a regular icosahedron, with the obtuse angle in the faces of golden rhombi equal to the dihedral angle of a regular octahedron and the tetrahedral vertex-center-vertex angle, which is also the angle between Plateau borders: °. The rhombic enneacontahedron is the zonohedrification of the regular dodecahedron, and it is the dual polyhedron to the rectified truncated icosahedron, a near-miss Johnson solid. On the other hand, the final stellation of the icosahedron has 90 edges. It also has 92 vertices like the rhombic enneacontahedron, when interpreted as a simple polyhedron.  

The Witting polytope contains ninety van Oss polytopes such that sections by the common plane of two non-orthogonal hyperplanes of symmetry passing through the center yield complex Möbius–Kantor polygons. The root vectors of simple Lie group E8 are represented by the vertex arrangement of the 421 polytope, which is shared by the Witting polytope in four-dimensional complex space.

In science 
Ninety is:

 the atomic number of thorium, an actinide. As an atomic weight, 90 identifies an isotope of strontium, a by-product of nuclear reactions including fallout. It contaminates milk.
 the latitude in degrees of the North and the South geographical poles.

In sports
 Nike Total 90 Apparel is a brand name of football apparel and football equipment from equipment bags to goalkeeper gloves
 The car number most associated with former NASCAR team owner Junie Donlavey
 The total number of minutes in an association football match.

In other fields

+90 is the code for international direct dial phone calls to Turkey.
90 is the code for the French département Belfort.

References

Integers